Guillaume Colletet (12 March 1598 – 11 February 1659) was a French poet and a founder member of the Académie française. His son was François Colletet.

Biography
Colletet was born and died in Paris.  He had a great reputation among his contemporaries and enjoyed the patronage of several important people, including Cardinal Richelieu, which whom he sometimes collaborated and who once gave him 600 livres for six verses.

Colletet married, in succession, three female servants, one of whom, Claudine Le Nain, he attempted to pass off as a poet in her own right, himself composing works which she then signed.  When he realised he was dying, he produced a poem stating that she was giving up poetry following her husband's death; but no one was fooled.  Jean de La Fontaine wrote an epigram on the subject.

Works
 Divertissements  ;
poems (tragedies, pastorals, etc.), including  le Banquet des Poètes  (1646) ;
 Epigramme  (1653) ;
 Histoire des poètes français .
Much-esteemed treatises on moral poetry, sonnets and eclogues, gathered under the title d'Art poétique, 1658
Translations, including of the Couches de la Vierge by Jacopo Sannazaro and of works by Scévole de Sainte-Marthe.

See also

 Guirlande de Julie

References

External links
 

Writers from Paris
1598 births
1659 deaths
17th-century French male writers
17th-century French poets
Members of the Académie Française
17th-century French dramatists and playwrights